is a trilogy of thematically related adult anime feature films originally conceived and initiated by Osamu Tezuka and made at his Mushi Production animation studio from the late 1960s to early 1970s.

As well as the erotic themes, they are also defined by mixing more typical traditional animation with sequences of UPA and Yōji Kuri–influenced experimental use of modern design, limited animation, and still paintings akin to Tezuka's experimental short films and like those largely were all directed, sometimes sharing the billing with Tezuka, by Eiichi Yamamoto. The first two are also notable for having scores by famed composer and electronic rearranger Isao Tomita. The third, Belladonna, made without Tezuka's direct involvement, is more serious than its predecessors and more avant-garde still, telling its story largely through pans over still, panoramic paintings with narration.

The three films in the trilogy are:
  (1969)
  (1970)
  (1973)
All three were released onto DVD-Video by the video division of Columbia Music Entertainment, both separately and as a box set, in 2004 in Japan and re-released in 2006.

A 1991 original video animation based on part of Ihara Saikaku's The Life of an Amorous Man (released on VHS in the United Kingdom and Ireland as The Sensualist) made at Grouper Production is sometimes considered an unofficial successor to the trilogy, owing to the involvement of Yamamoto as screenwriter and its similar experimental imagery.

See also
 List of Osamu Tezuka anime
 Pier Paolo Pasolini's Trilogy of Life
 The Decameron
 The Canterbury Tales
 Arabian Nights

Notes

External links
 Official website 
 Mushi Production's English website

Anime film series
Fantasy film series
Film series introduced in 1969
Japanese film series
Osamu Tezuka anime
Trilogies